David Brody (born June 5, 1930) is an American historian, who is professor emeritus of history at the University of California-Davis.

Life and education
Brody was born in Elizabeth, New Jersey, his parents had immigrated to the United States. Working his way through Harvard University, he received his bachelor's degree in 1952, a master's degree in 1953 and Ph.D. in history in 1958. His dissertation director was Oscar Handlin.

As Brody explains, he did not intend to become a labor historian:

Research focus
Brody's research focuses on the American labor movement and American history. Along with David Montgomery and Herbert Gutman, he is credited with founding the field of "new labor history" in North America, which examined working-class culture rather than simply workers' organizations as a source of history.

Brody's most coherent statement of the "new labor history" can be found in his article titled "The Old Labor History and the New: In Search of an American Working Class" (Labor History, 20[1979]: 111–26).

Brody rose to prominence following the 1960 publication of his pioneering history of early steelworker unions, The Steelworkers in America: The Nonunion Era, a book based on his doctoral dissertation. He has written numerous articles and book-length treatments of the ethical, organizational and social construction of work and employment.

In the 21st century, Brody has focused on the origins and transformation of American labor law, labor law reform and weaknesses in the structure and interpretation of the National Labor Relations Act.

Brody is Professor Emeritus at the University of California, Davis, where he taught for many years. He is affiliated with the Institute of Industrial Relations (IIR) at the University of California, Berkeley.

Memberships and awards
Brody is a member of the Society of American Historians and the American Historical Association.  He served as president of the Pacific Coast branch of the American Historical Association from 1991 to 1992. He is also a member of the Organization of American Historians, and served on the group's executive board from 1976 to 1979.

Brody was a senior fellow for the National Endowment for the Humanities in 1978. He won a Guggenheim Memorial Foundation fellowship in 1983, and was appointed as a senior professor in the Fulbright Program in 1975.  In 2008 he won the Sol Stetin Award for Labor History from the Sidney Hillman Foundation and a Distinguished Service to Labor and Working-Class History Award from the Labor and Working-Class History Association.

Brody is a member of Local 3 (San Francisco Chapter) of the National Writers Union, Local 1981, United Auto Workers, AFL-CIO.

Books by David Brody

Sole author
 Steelworkers in America: The Nonunion Era. Cambridge, Mass.: Harvard University Press, 1960; Illini Book edition. Urbana, Ill.: University of Illinois Press, 1998. 
 The Butcher Workmen: A Study of Unionization. Cambridge, Mass.: Harvard University Press, 1964. 
 Labor in Crisis: The Steel Strike of 1919. Philadelphia: J.B. Lippincott, 1965; Urbana, Ill.: University of Illinois Press, 1987. 

 Essays on the Age of Enterprise: 1870-1900. Ft. Worth: Dryden Press, 1974. 

 The American Labor Movement. Reprint ed. Lanham, Md.: University Press of America, 1985. 
 In Labor's Cause: Main Themes on the History of the American Worker. New York: Oxford University Press USA, 1993. 
 Workers in Industrial America: Essays on the Twentieth-Century Struggle. 2nd ed. New York: Oxford University Press USA, 1993. 

 Labor Embattled: History, Power, Rights.  Urbana, Ill.: University of Illinois Press, 2005. Cloth ; Paperback

Co-written works
 Henretta, James A.; Brody, David; and Dumenil, Lynn. America: A Concise History. Volume 2: Since 1865. 5th ed. New York: Bedford/St. Martin's, 2005. 
 Henretta, James A.; Brody, David; Dumenil, Lynn; and Ware, Susan. America's History. Volume I: To 1877. 5th ed. New York: Bedford/St. Martin's, 2003.

Important articles
 "Labor History, Industrial Relations, and the Crisis of American Labor." Industrial and Labor Relations Review. 43(1989): 8.
 "The Old Labor History and the New: In Search of an American Working Class." Labor History. 20(1979): 111–26.

See also
 Labor history (discipline)

References

Who's Who in America. 58th ed. New Providence, NJ: Marquis Who's Who, 2004.

21st-century American historians
21st-century American male writers
Historians of the United States
Labor historians
Harvard University alumni
University of California, Davis faculty
Writers from Elizabeth, New Jersey
Living people
1930 births
Historians from New Jersey
American male non-fiction writers